Horsemonden may refer to:

William Horsemonden, MP
Horsmonden, village